Damiano Daniele Pecile (born April 11, 2002) is a Canadian professional soccer player who plays as a defensive midfielder for KTP, on loan from  Serie B club Venezia.

Club career

Vancouver Whitecaps
Born in Burnaby, B.C Canada. Pecile signed as a homegrown player for the Vancouver Whitecaps FC on February 14, 2020. On November 8, 2020, he made his MLS debut, coming on as a substitute in the final minutes of a 3–0 win over the LA Galaxy.

Venezia
On May 2, 2021, Pecile was loaned out to Italian side Venezia for one season. In Italy, the midfielder featured as an over-age player for the club's Under-19 squad, which he captained, although he received several call-ups to the first team under head coach Paolo Zanetti, as well.

On July 9, 2022, Venezia announced that Pecile had joined the club on a permanent deal. He made his official debut for Venezia's senior team the next month on August 7, starting against Ascoli in a Coppa Italia match.

In February 2023, Pecile was loaned to Veikkausliiga side KTP along with teammate Jack de Vries.

International career
Pecile is eligible to represent both countries at international level. So far, he has represented the former nation at Under-17 level.

He participated in the 2019 CONCACAF U-17 Championship, where the Canadian national team finished fourth.

Later that year, he was selected to Canada's final 21-man squad for the 2019 FIFA U-17 World Cup in Brazil. He would play in all three of Canada's group stage matches, as his side went winless and were eventually eliminated.

Style of play 
Pecile has been described as a box-to-box midfielder, as he has shown versatility, a high work-rate, notable technical skills and good athleticism. Mainly used in a defensive role, he is also able to operate as a center-back, a holding playmaker or a mezzala. Moreover, his offensive abilities allow him to provide team-mates with assists or finish by himself.

Personal life
Pecile holds Italian citizenship.

References

Living people
2002 births
Sportspeople from Burnaby
Canadian people of Italian descent
Canadian soccer players
Canada men's youth international soccer players
Association football midfielders
Major League Soccer players
Vancouver Whitecaps FC players
Venezia F.C. players
Homegrown Players (MLS)
Soccer people from British Columbia